This is a complete list of songs by American progressive metal band Dream Theater. Dream Theater was formed in 1985 by guitarist John Petrucci, bassist John Myung, and drummer Mike Portnoy. The band's current line-up consists of Petrucci, Myung, keyboardist Jordan Rudess, vocalist James LaBrie, and drummer Mike Mangini. As of 2021, Dream Theater has released fifteen studio albums.

List

Medleys

References 

Dream Theater